Jason Shepherd is a Welsh podcast host, author, artist and audiobook narrator. Since 2008 he has produced and hosted the internationally recognized Learn Welsh Podcast, about Welsh language and culture, and has been involved in several book projects. Shepherd was an honorary guest of the Los Angeles St. David's Day Festival between 2011 and 2013, where he taught the Welsh language, and worked as Cultural Editor of Celtic Family Magazine from 2013 to 2015.

Personal life
Shepherd lives with his wife Amanda in the Gower area of Swansea, Wales where he teaches art and conducts music performances.

Bibliography
 Learn Welsh Now: A Beginner’s Guide to Welsh (2014)

As Illustrator
 A Welsh Alphabet (2011), author Lorin Morgan-Richards
 The Children's Voice: A Definitive Collection of Welsh Nursery Rhymes (2012), author Peter Anthony Freeman
 Age of Saints (2013), author Peter Anthony Freeman

As narrator
 A Boy Born from Mold and Other Delectable Morsels (2010), author Lorin Morgan-Richards
 Simon Snootle and Other Small Stories (2012), author Lorin Morgan-Richards
 A Welsh Alphabet (2012), author Lorin Morgan-Richards
 The Dreaded Summons and Other Misplaced Bills (2018), author Lorin Morgan-Richards

References

External links
 Learn Welsh Podcast

Living people
Audiobook narrators
Welsh-language writers
Welsh children's writers
21st-century Welsh historians
Year of birth missing (living people)